Miloš Ivanović is a former Serbian pianist and professor at the Faculty of Music at Belgrade.

See also
Music of Serbia

References

External links

Faculty of Music in Belgrade 

Academic staff of the University of Arts in Belgrade
Serbian classical pianists
University of Arts in Belgrade alumni
Living people
Year of birth missing (living people)
Place of birth missing (living people)